Sarıyazı can refer to:

 Sarıyazı, Kemah
 Sarıyazı, Osmaneli